Savinskaya is a rural locality (a village) in Mikhaylovskoye Rural Settlement, Kharovsky District, Vologda Oblast, Russia. The population was 6 as of 2002.

Geography 
Savinskaya is located 20 km northeast of Kharovsk (the district's administrative centre) by road. Panatovo is the nearest rural locality.

References 

Rural localities in Kharovsky District